The toli shad or Chinese herring (Tenualosa toli) is a fish of the family Clupeidae, a species of shad distributed in the western Indian Ocean and the Bay of Bengal to the Java Sea and the South China Sea. It may be found in Mauritius and the Cambodian Mekong near the Vietnam border. It inhabits fast-flowing, turbid estuaries and adjacent coastal waters.

Known as ikan terubok in Malaysia, T. toli is highly prized among Malaysians for its meat and eggs. Overfishing has depleted the population alarmingly in Southeast Asia. Research center and fish farming are carried out by local farmers in many parts of Malaysia for conservation and commercial purposes.

In Bangladesh, where it is known as Ilisha Chandana (চন্দনা ইলিশ), it is commercially less important than T. ilisha. It is known as ငါးသလောက် • (nga:sa.lauk) /ŋəθəlaʊʔ/ in Myanmar, Trey Palung in Cambodia, Bhing in Maharashtra, Palwa in Gujarat, and Ullam / Seriya in Sri Lanka.

In Thailand, T. toli was called Pla talumpuk (ปลาตะลุมพุก) or Pla lumpuk (ปลาหลุมพุก), its name is origin of Laem Talumphuk (Talumphuk Cape) in Amphoe Pak Phanang, Nakhon Si Thammarat Province, due to in the past, this place is found abundant T. toli.

Ascending rivers to breed, T. toli is distinguished from similar clupeids, except Hilsa kelee (kelee shad or five spot herring), by a distinct median notch in upper jaw. Biology of this protandrous hermaphrodite is presumed to be similar to that of Tenualosa ilisha, but the fewer gill rakers suggest an intake of larger species of zooplankton as food.

References
 

Tenualosa
Fish of Thailand
Fish described in 1847